Il Mondo (Italian for "The World") may refer to:

  Il Mondo (magazine), Italian weekly magazine (1949–2014)
 Il Mondo (newspaper), Italian political newspaper founded in 1922 and suppressed by the fascist regime in October 1926
 "Il Mondo" (song), a 1965 song performed by Jimmy Fontana
 "Il Mondo", a card of the Tarocco Piemontese

See also
Mondo (disambiguation)